was the Governor of Miyazaki Prefecture from 2003 to 2006. In 2009, Ando was convicted of bribe-taking and bid-rigging which were offences that he had committed earlier when he was governor.

References 

Japanese politicians convicted of corruption
Governors of Miyazaki Prefecture
1941 births
2010 deaths
People convicted of bribery
University of Miyazaki alumni
People from Miyazaki Prefecture